Peter Brown is an American-based English businessman. After Brian Epstein recruited Brown to run the Epstein's music store in Liverpool, he became part of the Beatles' management team. He remained Epstein's and the Beatles' personal assistant until the band's dissolution. He helped found and served as a board member of Apple Corps and assumed Epstein's duties after the manager's death. He went on to establish many companies and resides in New York City.

The Beatles 
When the Epsteins opened a second store at 12–14 Whitechapel in Liverpool and put Brian Epstein in charge of the entire operation, Epstein often walked across the road to the Lewis's department store (which also had a music section), where Brown was employed. He watched Brown's sales technique and was impressed enough to lure Brown to work for NEMS with the offer of a higher salary and a commission on sales. Brown became a confidant to the Epstein family and ran the music store for Epstein before becoming part of the Beatles' management team. Brown was Epstein's and the Beatles' personal assistant during the 1960s. He was one of few to have direct contact with each Beatle, traveling worldwide with the band members and knowing their daily whereabouts.

Brown served as a board member of Apple Corps, the Beatles' company, which he helped establish. After Epstein's untimely death, Brown assumed many of the day-to-day management duties Epstein had performed.

Brown was witness to the wedding of Paul and Linda McCartney and best man and witness at the wedding of John Lennon and Yoko Ono during 1969. Lennon mentioned Brown in a line from "The Ballad of John and Yoko" ("Peter Brown called to say 'You can make it OK, you can get married in Gibraltar near Spain'"), one of the last Beatles singles.

After the Beatles disbanded in 1970, Brown became President and chief executive officer of the Robert Stigwood Organisation. In 1977, Brown formed the Entertainment Development Company. He founded Brown & Powers, a global public relations firm in 1983, which became BLJ Worldwide. He is chairman Emeritus of Literacy Partners, a member of the US Steering Committee for the Duke of Edinburgh's Award, a member of the board for British American Business, a member of the selection committee of the Lee Strasberg Artistic Achievement Award, and a board member of the American Associates of the National Theatre of Great Britain. Brown co-wrote with author Steven Gaines The Love You Make: An Insider's Story of The Beatles, a biography of the Beatles published in 1983.

References

External links 
 BLJ Worldwide – Global Strategic Communications (company website)

Living people
Year of birth missing (living people)
English expatriates in the United States
Businesspeople from London
Businesspeople from Liverpool
Businesspeople from New York City